"The Black Page #1" is a piece by American composer Frank Zappa known for being extraordinarily difficult to play. Originally written for the drum kit and melodic percussion (as "The Black Page Drum Solo"), the piece was later rearranged in several versions, including the "easy teenage New York version" (commonly referred to as "The Black Page #2") and a so-called "new-age version", among others.

Drummer Terry Bozzio said of the piece:

On the double live album Zappa in New York (recorded 12/1976, released 3/1978), Zappa noted the "statistical density" of the piece. It is written in common time with extensive use of tuplets, including tuplets inside tuplets. At several points there is a quarter note triplet (sixth notes) in which each beat is counted with its own tuplet of 5, 5 and 6; at another is a half note triplet (third notes) in which the second beat is a quintuplet (actually a tuplet of 7), and the third beat is divided into tuplets of 4 and 5. The song ends with a quarter note triplet composed of tuplets of 5, 5, and 6, followed by two tuplets of 11 in the space of one.

Zappa would re-arrange the song into "The Black Page #2" shortly after his band's mastery of the piece. This second version has a disco beat, but nevertheless retains nearly every metric complexity from #1. One notable difference in this version is that the final set of tuplets feature a rhythmic change and are repeated three times to conclude the song. The 1991 live album Make a Jazz Noise Here includes a so-called "new age version", which incorporates lounge and reggae music. The 1994 album You Can't Do That on Stage Anymore, Vol. 4 featured a version from 1984 that had a ska motif. Both of these versions included guitar solos from Zappa.

Performances 
In 2001, Terry Bozzio and Chad Wackerman released the video "Solos and Duets" which features "The Black Page" played as a duet between the two ex-Zappa drummers with a transcription of the piece scrolling along the bottom of the screen as it is being played. In 2006, "The Black Page" was featured on Zappa Plays Zappa - Tour de Frank, an ambitious effort by Dweezil Zappa to bring Zappa music to the stage again, played by himself and a new band. The 2006 tour also included, as special guests, Zappa alumni; singer & woodwind player Napoleon Murphy Brock, drummer Bozzio, and guitarist Steve Vai. In the 2006 shows, "The Black Page" was played first as a drum solo by Bozzio and then a second time as a guitar duet with Steve Vai. In 2014 "The Black Page" was immortalized by Terry Bozzio in the form of art he calls Rhythm & Sketch.  On canvas Terry's sketch of Zappa with "The Black Page" is layered with a rhythmic pattern of light traces from Terry's drumsticks.  This was a limited run of 25 canvases and sold out quickly. Drummer Morgan Ågren and guitarist Mike Keneally played the piece as an encore during Devin Townsend's "Empath Vol. 1" - Tour in 2019/2020.

References

External links
 Analysis of Zappa's unusual rhythms, including some transcriptions and MIDI recordings of "The Black Page"
 Interview by Vinnie Colaiuta for Modern Drummer, including a description of Vinnie's audition for Zappa
 Black Page Drum Solo & #2, from the 'Zappa Plays Zappa' tour

1978 songs
Frank Zappa songs
Compositions by Frank Zappa